ASTV may refer to:

 As seen on TV, marketing for products sold on television
  AS Seen ON TV Inc. (stock ticker: ASTV), see as seen on TV
 MYtv (formerly Afrikaanse Satellietelevisie) Afrikaans-language South African TV channel
 ASTV (Thailand), defunct Thai TV station established by Sondhi Limthongkul supporting the People's Alliance for Democracy, prominent during the 2008 Thai political crisis

See also

 STV (disambiguation)
 AST (disambiguation)
 ST (disambiguation)
 AS (disambiguation)
 TV (disambiguation)